The men's 10,000 metres event at the 2006 World Junior Championships in Athletics was held in Beijing, China, at Chaoyang Sports Centre on 16 August.

Medalists

Results

Final
16 August

Participation
According to an unofficial count, 23 athletes from 16 countries participated in the event.

References

10,000 metres
Long distance running at the World Athletics U20 Championships